Maryan Abdullahi Yusuf, also known as Maryam Abdullahi Yusuf, is a Somali banker. She is the Deputy Governor of the Central Bank of Somalia, having been appointed to the position on 24 April 2014. She serves under former interim Central Bank Governor Bashir Isse, who was concurrently approved as permanent Governor by the Cabinet.

References

Living people
Ethnic Somali people
Somalian economists
Year of birth missing (living people)